The Roman Catholic Diocese of Mayagüez is an ecclesiastical territory or diocese of the Roman Catholic Church in the United States and consists of the western part of the island of Puerto Rico, an American commonwealth.  The diocese is led by a prelate bishop, who pastors the motherchurch in the City of Mayagüez, Catedral Nuestra Señora de la Candelaria in front of the Plaza Colón.

The See of Mayagüez was canonically erected on March 1, 1976 and is a suffragan diocese of the Metropolitan Province of San Juan de Puerto Rico.  The Diocese is subdivided into 29 Parishes: 17 originally located at the Diocese of Ponce, eight formerly at the Diocese of Arecibo, and four new parishes. Its jurisdiction includes the municipalities of Aguadilla, Rincón, Aguada, Moca, San Sebastián, Añasco, Mayagüez, Las Marías, Maricao, Hormigueros, Cabo Rojo, San Germán, and Sabana Grande.

As of July, 2011 the bishop of the See of Mayagüez was Alvaro Corrada del Rio, SJ.  He retired on May 9, 2020, and Ángel Luis Ríos Matos was appointed at that time to succeed him.

Ordinaries

The list of the Bishops of Mayagüez (Latin rite) and their tenures of service:
 Bishop Ulises Aurelio Casiano Vargas (March 4, 1976 – July 6, 2011)
 Bishop Alvaro Corrada del Rio, S.J. (July 6, 2011 – May 9, 2020)
 Bishop Ángel Luis Ríos Matos (August 1, 2020 - )

Schools
Colegio San Agustin, Cabo Rojo, Grades: PK-12
Colegio San Benito, Mayagüez, Grades PK-12
Colegio San Carlos, Aguadilla, Grades: PK-12 (Closed)
Academia Inmaculada Concepcion Elemental, Mayaguez, Grades: PK-6
Academia Inmaculada Concepcion - Superior, Mayagüez, Grades: 7-12
Colegio San José, San German, Grades: K-12
Academia San Luis, Lajas, Grades: K-12
Colegio La Milagrosa, Mayagüez, Grades:PK-12
Academia San Sebastian Martir, Grades: K-9
Academia Santa Rosa de Lima, Rincón, Grades PK-6 (closed around 2000).
Colegio Nuestra Señora de la Monserrate, Moca, Grades PK-8
Escuela Catolica de la Salle, Añasco, Grades: 1-9
Colegio San Agustin y Espiritu Santo, Sabana Grande, Grades: Pre-PreK-8

Statistics 
By the year 2004 its population consisted of 491,518 people, of which 376,000 were baptized, being 76.5% of the total population.

|-
| 1976 || 352.356 || ? || ? || 56 || 21 || 35 || 6.292 ||  || 4 || 105 || 25
|-
| 1980 || 374.000 || 469.000 || 79,7 || 66 || 21 || 45 || 5.666 ||  || 54 || 115 || 25
|-
| 1990 || 426.000 || 519.000 || 82,1 || 74 || 40 || 34 || 5.756 || 2 || 39 || 149 || 29
|-
| 1999 || 360.000 || 491.518 || 73,2 || 77 || 47 || 30 || 4.675 || 3 || 32 || 143 || 58
|-
| 2000 || 360.000 || 491.518 || 73,2 || 71 || 41 || 30 || 5.070 || 3 || 32 || 135 || 58
|-
| 2001 || 360.000 || 491.518 || 73,2 || 70 || 40 || 30 || 5.142 || 3 || 32 || 134 || 58
|-
| 2002 || 360.000 || 491.518 || 73,2 || 68 || 38 || 30 || 5.294 || 4 || 32 || 133 || 58
|-
| 2003 || 376.000 || 491.518 || 76,5 || 67 || 37 || 30 || 5.611 || 4 || 32 || 133 || 29
|-
| 2004 || 376.000 || 491.518 || 76,5 || 70 || 40 || 30 || 5.371 || 4 || 32 || 114 || 29
|}

San Juan Archdiocese bankruptcy
On 7 September 2018, Judge Edward Godoy ruled that the bankruptcy filed by the Archdiocese of San Juan would also apply to every Catholic diocese in Puerto Rico, including Mayagüez, and that all would now have their assets protected under Chapter 11.

See also

 Catholic Church by country
 Catholic Church in the United States
 Ecclesiastical Province of San Juan de Puerto Rico
 Global organisation of the Catholic Church
 List of Roman Catholic archdioceses (by country and continent)
 List of Roman Catholic dioceses (alphabetical) (including archdioceses)
 List of Roman Catholic dioceses (structured view) (including archdioceses)
 List of the Catholic dioceses of the United States

References

External links
 Diócesis de Mayagüez (Official Site in Spanish)
 Roman Catholic Diocese of Mayagüez GCatholic.org website
 Old Official Site of the Diocese in Spanish  (defunct) 
  Diocese of Mayagüez YouTube Channel run by Medios de Comunicación Social - Diócesis de Mayagüez (Social Communication Media Productions of the Diocese of Mayagüez) (PRODIOMA) (Official Site in Spanish)

Mayaguez
Mayaguez
Christian organizations established in 1976
Mayagüez, Puerto Rico
Mayaguez
1976 establishments in Puerto Rico